Uniontown may refer to:

Uniontown, Alabama
Uniontown, Arkansas
Uniontown, California
Uniontown, former name of Lotus, California
Uniontown, Jackson County, Indiana
Uniontown, Perry County, Indiana
Uniontown, Kansas
Uniontown, Kentucky
Uniontown, Maryland
Uniontown, Missouri
Uniontown, Ohio
Uniontown, Belmont County, Ohio
Uniontown, Pennsylvania
Uniontown, Washington
Uniontown, the original name of the Anacostia Historic District neighborhood in Washington, D.C.